Zhou Yihan (born 30 January 1994) is a Chinese-born Singaporean table tennis player. Born in China, she moved to Singapore in 2009 via the Foreign Sports Talent Scheme. She was eligible to play in 2011.

Zhou won a team gold at the 2014 Commonwealth Games and a team Bronze at the 2014 Asian Games.

On 2 June 2015, Zhou and her compatriot, Lin Ye, defeated top seed, Feng Tianwei and Yu Mengyu 4–3 to clinch the Women Doubles title in 28th Southeast Asian Games held in Singapore. The pair continued their good momentum and caused one of the biggest upset in history when they defeated the top doubles pair Ding Ning and Liu Shiwen 3–0 in ITTF World Tour, Japan Open Semi-Final but lost to another China pair of Wu Yang and Liu Fei in Final.

2016 Summer Olympics 
Zhou was selected and debuted as the third player for the women's team by the Singapore Table Tennis Association for the Olympics. The Singapore women's team, comprising Zhou, Yu Mengyu and Feng Tianwei, reached the semi-final of the team event but lost to China 0–3. In the bronze medal match, the trio was defeated by Japan 1–3.

 Team Event

References

External links
 

Living people
1994 births
Table tennis players from Shenyang
Chinese emigrants to Singapore
Naturalised citizens of Singapore
Singaporean sportspeople of Chinese descent
Naturalised table tennis players
Chinese female table tennis players
Singaporean female table tennis players
Table tennis players at the 2014 Commonwealth Games
Table tennis players at the 2014 Asian Games
Asian Games medalists in table tennis
Asian Games bronze medalists for Singapore
Commonwealth Games gold medallists for Singapore
Table tennis players at the 2016 Summer Olympics
Olympic table tennis players of Singapore
Commonwealth Games medallists in table tennis
Medalists at the 2014 Asian Games
Table tennis players at the 2018 Commonwealth Games
Southeast Asian Games medalists in table tennis
Southeast Asian Games gold medalists for Singapore
Southeast Asian Games silver medalists for Singapore
Southeast Asian Games bronze medalists for Singapore
Competitors at the 2013 Southeast Asian Games
Competitors at the 2015 Southeast Asian Games
Competitors at the 2017 Southeast Asian Games
Medallists at the 2014 Commonwealth Games
Medallists at the 2018 Commonwealth Games